Gustav Adolfs torg is a public square located in Malmö, Sweden. The square is named after Swedish king Gustav IV Adolf, who was resident in Malmö between 1806 and 1807. The square has served as a central point for public transit since the trams were moved there in 1906-1907, and continues to serve as one today for the city bus network of Malmö.

References

Transport in Malmö
Squares in Sweden
Tourist attractions in Malmö
19th-century works